The 1988 Santam Bank Trophy Division A was the third tier of domestic South African rugby, below the two Currie Cup divisions.

Teams

Competition

Regular season and title play-offs
There were six participating teams in the Santam Bank Trophy Division A. These teams were split into two sections of three teams each. Teams played the teams in their own section once over the course of the season and teams in the other section twice, once at home and once away. Teams received two points for a win and one points for a draw. The top team qualified for the Division A section finals, played at the home venue of the higher-placed team, as well as the Division A finals.

Promotion play-offs
The Division A champion qualified for the promotion play-offs. That team played off against the team placed sixth in the Currie Cup Division B over two legs. The winner over these two ties qualified for the 1989 Currie Cup Division B, while the losing team qualified for the 1989 Santam Bank Trophy Division A.

Relegation play-offs
The bottom team on the log with the worst record in their group qualified for the relegation play-offs. That team played off against the team that won the Santam Bank Trophy Division B over two legs. The winner over these two ties qualified for the 1989 Santam Bank Trophy Division A, while the losing team qualified for the 1989 Santam Bank Trophy Division B.

Log

Fixtures and results

Round one

Round two

Round three

Round four

Round five

Round six

Round seven

Round eight

Round nine

Round ten

Round eleven

Round twelve

Final

Santam Bank Trophy Finals
The top two teams from Division A and the top two teams from Division B qualified to the Trophy finals:

Semi-finals

Final

Promotion/relegation play-offs

Promotion play-offs
In the promotion play-offs,  beat  on aggregate and won promotion to the Currie Cup Division B.  were initially relegated to the Division A, but due to the Currie Cup Division A's subsequent expansion to 8 teams, they retained their place.

Relegation play-offs

See also
 1988 Currie Cup Division A
 1988 Currie Cup Division B
 1988 Santam Bank Trophy Division B
 1988 Lion Cup

References

1988A
1988 Currie Cup